Turośl  is a village in Kolno County, Podlaskie Voivodeship, in north-eastern Poland. It is the seat of the gmina (administrative district) called Gmina Turośl.

The village has a population of 1,500.

References

Villages in Kolno County